Narsang Tekri is one of the important areas in Porbandar district in the Indian state of Gujarat. Narsang Tekri has three parts. Two belong to two municipalities of Porbandar Tehsil and one belongs to Dharampur Village in Ranavav Tehsil.

Narsang Tekri, the telephone exchange, Modhanagar etc.m belong to Porbandar Municipality. Sudama Parotha House Society area and Saibaba Temple Society Area belong to Chhaya Municipality. Rajiv Nagar Area belongs to Dharampur village in Ranavav Tehsil.

Porbandar